Rice is the seed of the grass species Oryza sativa (Asian rice) or less commonly O. glaberrima (African rice). The name wild rice is usually used for species of the genera Zizania and Porteresia, both wild and domesticated, although the term may also be used for primitive or uncultivated varieties of Oryza.

As a cereal grain, domesticated rice is the most widely consumed staple food for over half of the world's human population, particularly in Asia and Africa. It is the agricultural commodity with the third-highest worldwide production, after sugarcane and maize. Since sizable portions of sugarcane and maize crops are used for purposes other than human consumption, rice is the most important food crop with regard to human nutrition and caloric intake, providing more than one-fifth of the calories consumed worldwide by humans. There are many varieties of rice and culinary preferences tend to vary regionally.

The traditional method for cultivating rice is flooding the fields while, or after, setting the young seedlings. This simple method requires sound irrigation planning, but reduces the growth of less robust weed and pest plants that have no submerged growth state, and deters vermin. While flooding is not mandatory for the cultivation of rice, all other methods of irrigation require higher effort in weed and pest control during growth periods and a different approach for fertilizing the soil.

Rice, a monocot, is normally grown as an annual plant, although in tropical areas it can survive as a perennial and can produce a ratoon crop for up to 30 years. Rice cultivation is well-suited to countries and regions with low labor costs and high rainfall, as it is labor-intensive to cultivate and requires ample water. However, rice can be grown practically anywhere, even on a steep hill or mountain area with the use of water-controlling terrace systems. Although its parent species are native to Asia and certain parts of Africa, centuries of trade and exportation have made it commonplace in many cultures worldwide. Production and consumption of rice is estimated to have been responsible for 4% of global greenhouse gas emissions in 2010.

Characteristics

Food

Rice is commonly consumed as food around the world.

Cooking
The varieties of rice are typically classified as long-, medium-, and short-grained. The grains of long-grain rice (high in amylose) tend to remain intact after cooking; medium-grain rice (high in amylopectin) becomes more sticky. Medium-grain rice is used for sweet dishes, for risotto in Italy, and many rice dishes, such as arròs negre, in Spain. Some varieties of long-grain rice that are high in amylopectin, known as Thai Sticky rice, are usually steamed. A stickier short-grain rice is used for sushi; the stickiness allows rice to hold its shape when cooked. Short-grain rice is used extensively in Japan, including to accompany savoury dishes. Short-grain rice is often used for rice pudding.

Instant rice differs from parboiled rice in that it is fully cooked and then dried, though there is a significant degradation in taste and texture. Rice flour and starch often are used in batters and breadings to increase crispiness.

Preparation
Rinsing rice before cooking removes much of the starch, thereby reducing the extent to which individual grains will stick together. This yields a fluffier rice, whereas not rinsing yields a stickier and creamier result. Rice produced in the US is usually fortified with vitamins and minerals, and rinsing will result in a loss of nutrients.

Rice may be soaked to decrease cooking time, conserve fuel, minimize exposure to high temperature, and reduce stickiness. For some varieties, soaking improves the texture of the cooked rice by increasing expansion of the grains. Rice may be soaked for 30 minutes up to several hours.

Brown rice may be soaked in warm water for 20 hours to stimulate germination. This process, called germinated brown rice (GBR), activates enzymes and enhances amino acids including gamma-aminobutyric acid to improve the nutritional value of brown rice. This method is a result of research carried out for the United Nations International Year of Rice.

Rice is cooked by boiling or steaming, and absorbs water during cooking. With the absorption method, rice may be cooked in a volume of water equal to the volume of dry rice plus any evaporation losses. With the rapid-boil method, rice may be cooked in a large quantity of water which is drained before serving. Rapid-boil preparation is not desirable with enriched rice, as much of the enrichment additives are lost when the water is discarded. Electric rice cookers, popular in Asia and Latin America, simplify the process of cooking rice. Rice (or any other grain) is sometimes quickly fried in oil or fat before boiling (for example saffron rice or risotto); this makes the cooked rice less sticky, and is a cooking style commonly called pilaf in Iran and Afghanistan or biryani in India and Pakistan.

Dishes

In Arab cuisine, rice is an ingredient of many soups and dishes with fish, poultry, and other types of meat. It is used to stuff vegetables or is wrapped in grape leaves (dolma). When combined with milk, sugar, and honey, it is used to make desserts. In some regions, such as Tabaristan, bread is made using rice flour. Rice may be made into congee (also called rice porridge or rice gruel) by adding more water than usual, so that the cooked rice is saturated with water, usually to the point that it disintegrates. Rice porridge is commonly eaten as a breakfast food, and is a traditional food for the sick.

Nutrition
Rice is the staple food of over half the world's population. It is the predominant dietary energy source for 17 countries in Asia and the Pacific, 9 countries in North and South America and 8 countries in Africa. Rice provides 20% of the world's dietary energy supply, while wheat supplies 19% and maize (corn) 5%.

Cooked unenriched long-grain white rice is composed of 68% water, 28% carbohydrates, 3% protein, and 1% fat (table). A  reference serving of it provides  of food energy and contains no micronutrients in significant amounts, with all less than 10% of the Daily Value (DV) (table). Cooked short-grain white rice provides the same food energy and contains moderate amounts of B vitamins, iron, and manganese (10–17% DV) per 100-gram serving (table).

A detailed analysis of nutrient content of rice suggests that the nutrition value of rice varies based on a number of factors. It depends on the strain of rice, such as white, brown, red, and black (or purple) varieties having different prevalence across world regions. It also depends on nutrient quality of the soil rice is grown in, whether and how the rice is polished or processed, the manner it is enriched, and how it is prepared before consumption.

A 2018 World Health Organization (WHO) guideline showed that fortification of rice to reduce malnutrition may involve different micronutrient strategies, including iron only, iron with zinc, vitamin A, and folic acid, or iron with other B-complex vitamins, such as thiamin, niacin, vitamin B6, and pantothenic acid. A systematic review of clinical research on the efficacy of rice fortification showed the strategy had the main effect of reducing the risk of iron deficiency by 35% and increasing blood levels of hemoglobin. The guideline established a major recommendation: "Fortification of rice with iron is recommended as a public health strategy to improve the iron status of populations, in settings where rice is a staple food."

Rice grown experimentally under elevated carbon dioxide levels, similar to those predicted for the year 2100 as a result of human activity, had less iron, zinc, and protein, as well as lower levels of thiamin, riboflavin, folic acid, and pantothenic acid.
The following table shows the nutrient content of rice and other major staple foods in a raw form on a dry weight basis to account for their different water contents.

Arsenic concerns

As arsenic occurs in soil, water, and air, the United States Food and Drug Administration (FDA) monitors the levels of arsenic in foods, particularly in rice products used commonly for infant food. While growing, rice plants tend to absorb arsenic more readily than other food crops, requiring expanded testing by the FDA for possible arsenic-related risks associated with rice consumption in the United States. In April 2016, the FDA proposed a limit of 100 parts per billion (ppb) for inorganic arsenic in infant rice cereal and other foods to minimize exposure of infants to arsenic. For water contamination by arsenic, the United States Environmental Protection Agency has set a lower standard of 10 ppb.

Arsenic is a Group 1 carcinogen. The amount of arsenic in rice varies widely with the greatest concentration in brown rice and rice grown on land formerly used to grow cotton, such as in Arkansas, Louisiana, Missouri, and Texas. White rice grown in Arkansas, Louisiana, Missouri, and Texas, which account collectively for 76 percent of American-produced rice, had higher levels of arsenic than other regions of the world studied, possibly because of past use of arsenic-based pesticides to control cotton weevils. Jasmine rice from Thailand and Basmati rice from Pakistan and India contain the least arsenic among rice varieties in one study. China has set a limit of 150 ppb for arsenic in rice.

Bacillus cereus
When storing cooked rice for use the next day, rapid cooling is advised to reduce the risk of toxin production. One of the enterotoxins produced by Bacillus cereus is heat-resistant; reheating contaminated rice kills the bacteria, but does not destroy the toxin already present.

Rice-growing environments 
Rice growth and production are affected by: the environment, soil properties, biotic conditions, and cultural practices. Environmental factors include rainfall and water, temperature, photoperiod, solar radiation and, in some instances, tropical storms. Soil factors refer to soil type and their position in uplands or lowlands. Biotic factors deal with weeds, insects, diseases, and crop varieties.
 
Rice can be grown in different environments, depending upon water availability. Generally, rice does not thrive in a waterlogged area, yet it can survive and grow herein and it can survive flooding.

 Lowland, rainfed, which is drought prone, favors medium depth; waterlogged, submergence, and flood prone
 Lowland, irrigated, grown in both the wet season and the dry season
 Deep water or floating rice
 Coastal wetland
 Upland rice (also known as hill rice or Ghaiya rice)

History of cultivation

Production and commerce

Production

Other major producers were Bangladesh, Indonesia and Vietnam. The five major producers accounted for 72% of total production, while the top fifteen producers accounted for 91% of total world production in 2017 (see table on right). Developing countries account for 95% of the total production.

Rice is a major food staple and a mainstay for the rural population and their food security. It is mainly cultivated by small farmers in holdings of less than one hectare. Rice is also a wage commodity for workers in the cash crop or non-agricultural sectors. Rice is vital for the nutrition of much of the population in Asia, as well as in Latin America and the Caribbean and in Africa; it is central to the food security of over half the world population.

Many rice grain producing countries have significant losses post-harvest at the farm and because of poor roads, inadequate storage technologies, inefficient supply chains and farmer's inability to bring the produce into retail markets dominated by small shopkeepers. A World Bank – FAO study claims 8% to 26% of rice is lost in developing nations, on average, every year, because of post-harvest problems and poor infrastructure. Some sources claim the post-harvest losses exceed 40%. Not only do these losses reduce food security in the world, the study claims that farmers in developing countries such as China, India and others lose approximately US$89 billion of income in preventable post-harvest farm losses, poor transport, the lack of proper storage and retail. One study claims that if these post-harvest grain losses could be eliminated with better infrastructure and retail network, in India alone enough food would be saved every year to feed 70 to 100 million people.

===Processing===
 

The seeds of the rice plant are first milled using a rice huller to remove the chaff (the outer husks of the grain) (see: rice hulls). At this point in the process, the product is called brown rice. The milling may be continued, removing the bran, i.e., the rest of the husk and the germ, thereby creating white rice. White rice, which keeps longer, lacks some important nutrients; moreover, in a limited diet which does not supplement the rice, brown rice helps to prevent the disease beriberi.

Either by hand or in a rice polisher, white rice may be buffed with glucose or talc powder (often called polished rice, though this term may also refer to white rice in general), parboiled, or processed into flour. White rice may also be enriched by adding nutrients, especially those lost during the milling process. While the cheapest method of enriching involves adding a powdered blend of nutrients that will easily wash off (in the United States, rice which has been so treated requires a label warning against rinsing), more sophisticated methods apply nutrients directly to the grain, coating the grain with a water-insoluble substance which is resistant to washing.

In some countries, a popular form, parboiled rice (also known as converted rice and easy-cook rice) is subjected to a steaming or parboiling process while still a brown rice grain. The parboil process causes a gelatinisation of the starch in the grains. The grains become less brittle, and the color of the milled grain changes from white to yellow. The rice is then dried, and can then be milled as usual or used as brown rice. Milled parboiled rice is nutritionally superior to standard milled rice, because the process causes nutrients from the outer husk (especially thiamine) to move into the endosperm, so that less is subsequently lost when the husk is polished off during milling. Parboiled rice has an additional benefit in that it does not stick to the pan during cooking, as happens when cooking regular white rice. This type of rice is eaten in parts of India and countries of West Africa are also accustomed to consuming parboiled rice.

Rice bran, called nuka in Japan, is a valuable commodity in Asia and is used for many daily needs. It is a moist, oily inner layer which is heated to produce oil. It is also used as a pickling bed in making rice bran pickles and takuan.

Raw rice may be ground into flour for many uses, including making many kinds of beverages, such as amazake, horchata, rice milk, and rice wine. Rice does not contain gluten, so is suitable for people on a gluten-free diet. Rice can be made into various types of noodles. Raw, wild, or brown rice may also be consumed by raw-foodist or fruitarians if soaked and sprouted (usually a week to 30 days – gaba rice).

Processed rice seeds must be boiled or steamed before eating. Boiled rice may be further fried in cooking oil or butter (known as fried rice), or beaten in a tub to make mochi.

Rice is a good source of protein and a staple food in many parts of the world, but it is not a complete protein: it does not contain all of the essential amino acids in sufficient amounts for good health, and should be combined with other sources of protein, such as nuts, seeds, beans, fish, or meat.

Rice, like other cereal grains, can be puffed (or popped). This process takes advantage of the grains' water content and typically involves heating grains in a special chamber. Further puffing is sometimes accomplished by processing puffed pellets in a low-pressure chamber. The ideal gas law means either lowering the local pressure or raising the water temperature results in an increase in volume prior to water evaporation, resulting in a puffy texture. Bulk raw rice density is about 0.9 g/cm3. It decreases to less than one-tenth that when puffed.

Harvesting, drying and milling

Unmilled rice, known as "paddy" (Indonesia and Malaysia: padi; Philippines, palay), is usually harvested when the grains have a moisture content of around 25%. In most Asian countries, where rice is almost entirely the product of smallholder agriculture, harvesting is carried out manually, although there is a growing interest in mechanical harvesting. Harvesting can be carried out by the farmers themselves, but is also frequently done by seasonal labor groups. Harvesting is followed by threshing, either immediately or within a day or two. Again, much threshing is still carried out by hand but there is an increasing use of mechanical threshers. Subsequently, paddy needs to be dried to bring down the moisture content to no more than 20% for milling.

A familiar sight in several Asian countries is paddy laid out to dry along roads. However, in most countries the bulk of drying of marketed paddy takes place in mills, with village-level drying being used for paddy to be consumed by farm families. Mills either sun dry or use mechanical driers or both. Drying has to be carried out quickly to avoid the formation of molds. Mills range from simple hullers, with a throughput of a couple of tonnes a day, that simply remove the outer husk, to enormous operations that can process  a day and produce highly polished rice. A good mill can achieve a paddy-to-rice conversion rate of up to 72% but smaller, inefficient mills often struggle to achieve 60%. These smaller mills often do not buy paddy and sell rice but only service farmers who want to mill their paddy for their own consumption.

Distribution
Because of the importance of rice to human nutrition and food security in Asia, the domestic rice markets tend to be subject to considerable state involvement. While the private sector plays a leading role in most countries, agencies such as BULOG in Indonesia, the NFA in the Philippines, VINAFOOD in Vietnam and the Food Corporation of India are all heavily involved in purchasing of paddy from farmers or rice from mills and in distributing rice to poorer people. BULOG and NFA monopolise rice imports into their countries while VINAFOOD controls all exports from Vietnam.

Trade
World trade figures are very different from those for production, as less than 8% of rice produced is traded internationally. In economic terms, the global rice trade was a small fraction of 1% of world mercantile trade. Many countries consider rice as a strategic food staple, and various governments subject its trade to a wide range of controls and interventions.

Developing countries are the main players in the world rice trade, accounting for 83% of exports and 85% of imports. While there are numerous importers of rice, the exporters of rice are limited. Just five countries—Thailand, Vietnam, China, the United States and India—in decreasing order of exported quantities, accounted for about three-quarters of world rice exports in 2002. However, this ranking has been rapidly changing in recent years. In 2010, the three largest exporters of rice, in decreasing order of quantity exported were Thailand, Vietnam and India. By 2012, India became the largest exporter of rice with a 100% increase in its exports on year-to-year basis, and Thailand slipped to third position. Together, Thailand, Vietnam and India accounted for nearly 70% of the world rice exports.

The primary variety exported by Thailand and Vietnam were Jasmine rice, while exports from India included aromatic Basmati variety. China, an exporter of rice in early 2000s, was a net importer of rice in 2010 and will become the largest net importer, surpassing Nigeria, in 2013. According to a USDA report, the world's largest exporters of rice in 2012 were India, Vietnam, Thailand, Pakistan and the United States.

Major importers usually include Nigeria, Indonesia, Bangladesh, Saudi Arabia, Iran, Iraq, Malaysia, the Philippines, Brazil and some African and Persian Gulf countries. In common with other West African countries, Nigeria is actively promoting domestic production. However, its very heavy import duties (110%) open it to smuggling from neighboring countries. Parboiled rice is particularly popular in Nigeria. Although China and India are the two largest producers of rice in the world, both countries consume the majority of the rice produced domestically, leaving little to be traded internationally.

Yield records

These efforts employed newly developed rice breeds and System of Rice Intensification (SRI), a recent innovation in rice farming.

Price 

In late 2007 to May 2008, the price of grains rose greatly due to droughts in major producing countries (particularly Australia), increased use of grains for animal feed and US subsidies for bio-fuel production. Although there was no shortage of rice on world markets this general upward trend in grain prices led to panic buying by consumers, government rice export bans (in particular, by Vietnam and India) and inflated import orders by the Philippines marketing board, the National Food Authority. This caused significant rises in rice prices. In late April 2008, prices hit 24 US cents a pound, twice the price of seven months earlier.

On April 30, 2008, Thailand announced plans for the creation of the Organisation of Rice Exporting Countries (OREC) with the intention that this should develop into a price-fixing cartel for rice. However,  little progress had been made to achieve this.

Worldwide consumption 

Between 1961 and 2002, per capita consumption of rice increased by 40% worldwide. A paper from the Korean Society of Crop Science anticipated that consumption would increase to 590 million tons by 2040, and that consumption would decline in Asia and increase in other parts of the world.

Rice is the most important crop in Asia. In Cambodia, for example, 90% of the total agricultural area is used for rice production. Per capita, Bangladesh ranks as the country with the highest rice consumption, followed by Laos, Cambodia, Vietnam and Indonesia.

U.S. rice consumption has risen sharply over the past 25 years, fueled in part by commercial applications such as beer production. Almost one in five adult Americans now report eating at least half a serving of white or brown rice per day.

Environmental impacts

Climate change 

The worldwide production of rice accounts for more greenhouse gas emissions (GHG) in total than that of any other plant food. It was estimated in 2021 to be responsible for 30% of agricultural methane emissions and 11% of agricultural nitrous oxide emissions. Methane release is caused by long-term flooding of rice fields, inhibiting the soil from absorbing atmospheric oxygen, a process causing anaerobic fermentation of organic matter in the soil. A 2021 study estimated that rice contributed 2 billion tonnes of anthropogenic greenhouse gases in 2010, of the 47 billion total. The study added up GHG emissions from the entire lifecycle, including production, transportation, and consumption, and compared the global totals of different foods. The total for rice was half the total for beef.

A 2010 study found that, as a result of rising temperatures and decreasing solar radiation during the later years of the 20th century, the rice yield growth rate has decreased in many parts of Asia, compared to what would have been observed had the temperature and solar radiation trends not occurred. The yield growth rate had fallen 10–20% at some locations. The study was based on records from 227 farms in Thailand, Vietnam, Nepal, India, China, Bangladesh, and Pakistan. The mechanism of this falling yield was not clear, but might involve increased respiration during warm nights, which expends energy without being able to photosynthesize. More detailed analysis of rice yields by the International Rice Research Institute forecast 20% reduction in yields in Asia per degree Celsius of temperature rise. Rice becomes sterile if exposed to temperatures above  for more than one hour during flowering and consequently produces no grain.

Water usage 
Rice requires slightly more water to produce than other grains. Rice production uses almost a third of Earth's fresh water. Water outflows from rice fields through transpiration, evaporation, seepage, and percolation.

Pests and diseases 
Rice pests are any organisms or microbes with the potential to reduce the yield or value of the rice crop (or of rice seeds). Rice pests include weeds, pathogens, insects, nematode, rodents, and birds. A variety of factors can contribute to pest outbreaks, including climatic factors, improper irrigation, the overuse of insecticides and high rates of nitrogen fertilizer application. Weather conditions also contribute to pest outbreaks. For example, rice gall midge and army worm outbreaks tend to follow periods of high rainfall early in the wet season, while thrips outbreaks are associated with drought.

Animal pests

Insects 

Major rice insect pests include: the brown planthopper (BPH), several species of stemborers—including those in the genera Scirpophaga and Chilo, the rice gall midge, several species of rice bugs, notably in the genus Leptocorisa, defoliators such as the rice: leafroller, hispa and grasshoppers. The fall army worm, a species of Lepidoptera, also targets and causes damage to rice crops. Rice weevils attack stored produce.

Nematodes 

Several nematode species infect rice crops, causing diseases such as Ufra (Ditylenchus dipsaci), White tip disease (Aphelenchoide bessei), and root knot disease (Meloidogyne graminicola). Some nematode species such as Pratylenchus spp. are most dangerous in upland rice of all parts of the world. Rice root nematode (Hirschmanniella oryzae) is a migratory endoparasite which on higher inoculum levels will lead to complete destruction of a rice crop. Beyond being obligate parasites, they also decrease the vigor of plants and increase the plants' susceptibility to other pests and diseases.

Other pests 
These include the apple snail (Pomacea canaliculata), panicle rice mite, rats, and the weed Echinochloa crusgali.

Diseases 

Rice blast, caused by the fungus Magnaporthe grisea (syn. M. oryzae, Pyricularia oryzae), is the most significant disease affecting rice cultivation. It and bacterial leaf streak (caused by Xanthomonas oryzae pv. oryzae) are perennially the two worst rice diseases worldwide, and such is their importance  and the importance of rice  that they are both among the worst 10 diseases of all plants. Fukuoka et al., 2009 clones one of the few quantitative disease loci for quantitative disease resistance ever cloned in plants, one for blast resistance in this crop. The plant responds to the blast pathogen by releasing jasmonic acid, which then cascades into the activation of further downstream metabolic pathways which produce the defense response. This accumulates as methyl-jasmonic acid. The pathogen responds by synthesizing an oxidizing enzyme which prevents this accumlation and its resulting alarm signal.  was discovered by Fujisaki et al., 2017. It is a nucleotide-binding leucine-rich repeat receptor (NB-LRR, NLR), an immunoreceptor. It includes an NOI domain (NO-Induced) which binds rice's own  protein. This protein is a target of the M. oryzae effector  and so this allows the NLR to monitor for Mos attack against that target.

Other major fungal and bacterial rice diseases include sheath blight (caused by Rhizoctonia solani), false smut (Ustilaginoidea virens), bacterial panicle blight (Burkholderia glumae), sheath rot (Sarocladium oryzae), and bakanae (Fusarium fujikuroi). Viral diseases exist, such as rice ragged stunt (vector: BPH), and tungro (vector: Nephotettix spp). Many viral diseases, especially those vectored by planthoppers and leafhoppers, are major causes of losses across the world. There is also an ascomycete fungus, Cochliobolus miyabeanus, that causes brown spot disease in rice.

Integrated pest management 

Crop protection scientists are trying to develop rice pest management techniques which are sustainable. In other words, to manage crop pests in such a manner that future crop production is not threatened. Sustainable pest management is based on four principles: biodiversity, host plant resistance (HPR), landscape ecology, and hierarchies in a landscape—from biological to social. At present, rice pest management includes cultural techniques, pest-resistant rice varieties, and pesticides (which include insecticide). Increasingly, there is evidence that farmers' pesticide applications are often unnecessary, and even facilitate pest outbreaks. By reducing the populations of natural enemies of rice pests, misuse of insecticides can actually lead to pest outbreaks. The International Rice Research Institute (IRRI) demonstrated in 1993 that an 87.5% reduction in pesticide use can lead to an overall drop in pest numbers. IRRI also conducted two campaigns in 1994 and 2003, respectively, which discouraged insecticide misuse and smarter pest management in Vietnam.

Rice plants produce their own chemical defenses to protect themselves from pest attacks. Some synthetic chemicals, such as the herbicide 2,4-D, cause the plant to increase the production of certain defensive chemicals and thereby increase the plant's resistance to some types of pests. Conversely, other chemicals, such as the insecticide imidacloprid, can induce changes in the gene expression of the rice that cause the plant to become more susceptible to attacks by certain types of pests. 5-Alkylresorcinols are chemicals that can also be found in rice.

Botanicals, so-called "natural pesticides", are used by some farmers in an attempt to control rice pests. Botanicals include extracts of leaves, or a mulch of the leaves themselves. Some upland rice farmers in Cambodia spread chopped leaves of the bitter bush (Chromolaena odorata) over the surface of fields after planting. This practice probably helps the soil retain moisture and thereby facilitates seed germination. Farmers also claim the leaves are a natural fertilizer and helps suppress weed and insect infestations. 

Among rice cultivars, there are differences in the responses to, and recovery from, pest damage. Many rice varieties have been selected for resistance to insect pests. Therefore, particular cultivars are recommended for areas prone to certain pest problems. The genetically based ability of a rice variety to withstand pest attacks is called resistance. Three main types of plant resistance to pests are recognized as nonpreference, antibiosis, and tolerance. Nonpreference (or antixenosis) describes host plants which insects prefer to avoid; antibiosis is where insect survival is reduced after the ingestion of host tissue; and tolerance is the capacity of a plant to produce high yield or retain high quality despite insect infestation.

Over time, the use of pest-resistant rice varieties selects for pests that are able to overcome these mechanisms of resistance. When a rice variety is no longer able to resist pest infestations, resistance is said to have broken down. Rice varieties that can be widely grown for many years in the presence of pests and retain their ability to withstand the pests are said to have durable resistance. Mutants of popular rice varieties are regularly screened by plant breeders to discover new sources of durable resistance.

Parasitic weeds
Rice is parasitized by the eudicot weed Striga hermonthica, which is of local importance for this crop.

Ecotypes and cultivars

While most rice is bred for crop quality and productivity, there are varieties selected for characteristics such as texture, smell, and firmness. There are four major categories of rice worldwide: indica, japonica, aromatic and glutinous. The different varieties of rice are not considered interchangeable, either in food preparation or agriculture, so as a result, each major variety is a completely separate market from other varieties. It is common for one variety of rice to rise in price while another one drops in price.

Rice cultivars also fall into groups according to environmental conditions, season of planting, and season of harvest, called ecotypes. Some major groups are the Japan-type (grown in Japan), "buly" and "tjereh" types (Indonesia); sali (or aman—main winter crop), ahu (also aush or ghariya, summer), and boro (spring) (Bengal and Assam). Cultivars exist that are adapted to deep flooding, and these are generally called "floating rice".

The largest collection of rice cultivars is at the International Rice Research Institute in the Philippines, with over 100,000 rice accessions held in the International Rice Genebank. Rice cultivars are often classified by their grain shapes and texture. For example, Thai Jasmine rice is long-grain and relatively less sticky, as some long-grain rice contains less amylopectin than short-grain cultivars. Chinese restaurants often serve long-grain as plain unseasoned steamed rice though short-grain rice is common as well. Japanese mochi rice and Chinese sticky rice are short-grain. Chinese people use sticky rice which is properly known as "glutinous rice" (note: glutinous refer to the glue-like characteristic of rice; does not refer to "gluten") to make zongzi. The Japanese table rice is a sticky, short-grain rice. Japanese sake rice is another kind as well.

Indian rice cultivars include long-grained and aromatic Basmati (ਬਾਸਮਤੀ) (grown in the North), long and medium-grained Patna rice, and in South India (Andhra Pradesh and Karnataka) short-grained Sona Masuri (also called as Bangaru theegalu). In the state of Tamil Nadu, the most prized cultivar is ponni which is primarily grown in the delta regions of the Kaveri River. Kaveri is also referred to as ponni in the South and the name reflects the geographic region where it is grown. In the Western Indian state of Maharashtra, a short grain variety called Ambemohar is very popular. This rice has a characteristic fragrance of Mango blossom.

Aromatic rices have definite aromas and flavors; the most noted cultivars are Thai fragrant rice, Basmati, Patna rice, Vietnamese fragrant rice, and a hybrid cultivar from America, sold under the trade name Texmati. Both Basmati and Texmati have a mild popcorn-like aroma and flavor. In Indonesia, there are also red and black cultivars.

High-yield cultivars of rice suitable for cultivation in Africa and other dry ecosystems, called the new rice for Africa (NERICA) cultivars, have been developed. It is hoped that their cultivation will improve food security in West Africa.

Draft genomes for the two most common rice cultivars, indica and japonica, were published in April 2002. Rice was chosen as a model organism for the biology of grasses because of its relatively small genome (~430 megabase pairs). Rice was the first crop with a complete genome sequence.

On December 16, 2002, the UN General Assembly declared the year 2004 the International Year of Rice. The declaration was sponsored by more than 40 countries.

The Thai kings have patronised rice breeding since at least the reign of Chulalongkorn, and his great-great-grandson Vajiralongkorn released five particular rice varieties to celebrate his coronation.

Biotechnology

High-yielding varieties 

The high-yielding varieties are a group of crops created intentionally during the Green Revolution to increase global food production. This project enabled labor markets in Asia to shift away from agriculture, and into industrial sectors. The first "Rice Car", IR8 was produced in 1966 at the International Rice Research Institute which is based in the Philippines at the University of the Philippines' Los Baños site. IR8 was created through a cross between an Indonesian variety named "Peta" and a Chinese variety named "Dee Geo Woo Gen."

Scientists have identified and cloned many genes involved in the gibberellin signaling pathway, including GAI1 (Gibberellin Insensitive) and SLR1 (Slender Rice). Disruption of gibberellin signaling can lead to significantly reduced stem growth leading to a dwarf phenotype. Photosynthetic investment in the stem is reduced dramatically as the shorter plants are inherently more stable mechanically. Assimilates become redirected to grain production, amplifying in particular the effect of chemical fertilizers on commercial yield. In the presence of nitrogen fertilizers, and intensive crop management, these varieties increase their yield two to three times.

Future potential 

As the UN Millennium Development project seeks to spread global economic development to Africa, the "Green Revolution" is cited as the model for economic development. With the intent of replicating the successful Asian boom in agronomic productivity, groups like the Earth Institute are doing research on African agricultural systems, hoping to increase productivity. An important way this can happen is the production of "New Rices for Africa" (NERICA). These rices, selected to tolerate the low input and harsh growing conditions of African agriculture, are produced by the African Rice Center, and billed as technology "from Africa, for Africa". The NERICA have appeared in The New York Times (October 10, 2007) and International Herald Tribune (October 9, 2007), trumpeted as miracle crops that will dramatically increase rice yield in Africa and enable an economic resurgence. Ongoing research in China to develop perennial rice could result in enhanced sustainability and food security.

Golden rice

Expression of human proteins 

Ventria Bioscience has genetically modified rice to express lactoferrin, lysozyme which are proteins usually found in breast milk, and human serum albumin, These proteins have antiviral, antibacterial, and antifungal effects.

Rice containing these added proteins can be used as a component in oral rehydration solutions which are used to treat diarrheal diseases, thereby shortening their duration and reducing recurrence. Such supplements may also help reverse anemia.

Flood-tolerant rice

Due to the varying levels that water can reach in regions of cultivation, flood tolerant varieties have long been developed and used. Flooding is an issue that many rice growers face, especially in South and South East Asia where flooding annually affects . Standard rice varieties cannot withstand stagnant flooding of more than about a week, mainly as it disallows the plant access to necessary requirements such as sunlight and essential gas exchanges, inevitably leading to plants being unable to recover.
In the past, this has led to massive losses in yields, such as in the Philippines, where in 2006, rice crops worth $65 million were lost to flooding. Recently developed cultivars seek to improve flood tolerance.

Drought-tolerant rice

Under drought conditions, without sufficient water to afford them the ability to obtain the required levels of nutrients from the soil, conventional commercial rice varieties can be severely affected—for example, yield losses as high as 40% have affected some parts of India, with resulting losses of around US$800 million annually.

The International Rice Research Institute conducts research into developing drought-tolerant rice varieties, including the varieties 5411 and Sookha dhan, currently being employed by farmers in the Philippines and Nepal respectively. In addition, in 2013 the Japanese National Institute for Agrobiological Sciences led a team which successfully inserted the DEEPER ROOTING 1 (DRO1) gene, from the Philippine upland rice variety Kinandang Patong, into the popular commercial rice variety IR64, giving rise to a far deeper root system in the resulting plants. This facilitates an improved ability for the rice plant to derive its required nutrients in times of drought via accessing deeper layers of soil, a feature demonstrated by trials which saw the IR64 + DRO1 rice yields drop by 10% under moderate drought conditions, compared to 60% for the unmodified IR64 variety.

Salt-tolerant rice

Soil salinity poses a major threat to rice crop productivity, particularly along low-lying coastal areas during the dry season. These high concentrations of salt can severely affect rice plants' normal physiology, especially during early stages of growth, and as such farmers are often forced to abandon these otherwise potentially usable areas.

Progress has been made, however, in developing rice varieties capable of tolerating such conditions; the hybrid created from the cross between the commercial rice variety IR56 and the wild rice species Oryza coarctata is one example. O. coarctata is capable of successful growth in soils with double the limit of salinity of normal varieties, but lacks the ability to produce edible rice. Developed by the International Rice Research Institute, the hybrid variety can utilise specialised leaf glands that allow for the removal of salt into the atmosphere. It was initially produced from one successful embryo out of 34,000 crosses between the two species; this was then backcrossed to IR56 with the aim of preserving the genes responsible for salt tolerance that were inherited from O. coarctata. Extensive trials are planned prior to the new variety being available to farmers by approximately 2017–18.

When the problem of soil salinity arises it will be opportune to select salt tolerant varieties (IRRI or to resort to soil salinity control.

Soil salinity is often measured as the electric conductivity (EC) of the extract of a saturated soil paste (ECe). The EC units are usually expressed in decisiemens per metre or dS/m. The critical ECe value of 5.5 dS/m in the figure, obtained from measurements in farmers' fields, indicates that the rice crop is slightly salt sensitive.

Environment-friendly rice

Producing rice in paddies is harmful for the environment due to the release of methane by methanogenic bacteria. These bacteria live in the anaerobic waterlogged soil, and live off nutrients released by rice roots. Researchers have recently reported in Nature that putting the barley gene SUSIBA2 into rice creates a shift in biomass production from root to shoot (above ground tissue becomes larger, while below ground tissue is reduced), decreasing the methanogen population, and resulting in a reduction of methane emissions of up to 97%. Apart from this environmental benefit, the modification also increases the amount of rice grains by 43%, which makes it a useful tool in feeding a growing world population.

Meiosis and DNA repair

Rice is used as a model organism for investigating the molecular mechanisms of meiosis and DNA repair in higher plants. Meiosis is a key stage of the sexual cycle in which diploid cells in the ovule (female structure) and the anther (male structure) produce haploid cells that develop further into gametophytes and gametes. So far, 28 meiotic genes of rice have been characterized. Studies of rice gene OsRAD51C showed that this gene is necessary for homologous recombinational repair of DNA, particularly the accurate repair of DNA double-strand breaks during meiosis. Rice gene OsDMC1 was found to be essential for pairing of homologous chromosomes during meiosis, and rice gene OsMRE11 was found to be required for both synapsis of homologous chromosomes and repair of double-strand breaks during meiosis.

Cultural roles of rice

Rice plays an important role in certain religions and popular beliefs. In many cultures relatives will scatter rice during or towards the end of a wedding ceremony in front of the bride and groom.

The pounded rice ritual is conducted during weddings in Nepal. The bride gives a leafplate full of pounded rice to the groom after he requests it politely from her.

In the Philippines rice wine, popularly known as tapuy, is used for important occasions such as weddings, rice harvesting ceremonies and other celebrations.

Dewi Sri is the traditional rice goddess of the Javanese, Sundanese, and Balinese people in Indonesia. Most rituals involving Dewi Sri are associated with the mythical origin attributed to the rice plant, the staple food of the region. In Thailand, a similar rice deity is known as Phosop; she is a deity more related to ancient local folklore than a goddess of a structured, mainstream religion. The same female rice deity is known as Po Ino Nogar in Cambodia and as Nang Khosop in Laos. Ritual offerings are made during the different stages of rice production to propitiate the Rice Goddess in the corresponding cultures.

A 2014 study of Han Chinese communities found that a history of farming rice makes cultures more psychologically interdependent, whereas a history of farming wheat makes cultures more independent.

A Royal Ploughing Ceremony is held in certain Asian countries to mark the beginning of the rice planting season. It is still honored in the kingdoms of Cambodia and Thailand. The 2,600-year-old tradition  begun by Śuddhodana in Kapilavastu  was revived in the republic of Nepal in 2017 after a lapse of a few years.

Thai king Vajiralongkorn released five particular rice varieties to celebrate his coronation.

See also 

 Artificial rice
 Glutinous rice
 List of dried foods
 List of rice cultivars
 List of rice dishes
 Maratelli rice
 Mushroom production on rice straw
 Leaf Color Chart
 Post-harvest losses
 Puffed rice
 Rice Belt
 Rice bran oil
 Rice bread
 Rice wine
 Rice writing
 Rijsttafel
 Risotto
 Straw
 System of Rice Intensification
 Texas rice production
 Upland rice
 Wild rice

Notes

References

Further reading

External links 
 International Rice Research Institute

 
Crops originating from China
Grasses of Asia
Plant models
Types of food
Tropical agriculture